The Benton Fault is a geological fault in southern Pembrokeshire in Wales that was active as a normal fault during the deposition of the Old Red Sandstone during the Devonian period, forming a thick half graben. During the Carboniferous, the Benton Fault was strongly inverted as part of the Variscan Orogeny.

See also
List of geological faults of Wales

References

Geology of Wales